The Philippines men's national sepak takraw team represents the Philippines in international sepak takraw matches and competitions and is organized by the Philippine Amateur Sepak Takraw Association.

History
The Philippines has been competing in the sepak takraw events of the Southeast Asian Games.

The national team joined the first ISTAF World Cup in 2011 which was hosted by Malaysia winning over Bangladesh and Brunei enabling the team to join the inaugural 2011–12 ISTAF SuperSeries (ISS). The head coach for the 2011-2012 season was Rodolfo Eco led by players, John John Bobier and Jason Huerte.

At the King's Cup, the Philippines won the gold medal of Division I of the doubles event by defeating Brunei by 3-2.

They were set to participate at the next ISS series in 2013–14 but they did not enter in any of the four tournaments of the series. The Philippines was to be led by head coach Hector Memarion.

The Philippines did not participate at the first three tournaments of the 2014–15 ISTAF SuperSeries and were only invited to enter the fourth and Final tournament along with India after China and Indonesia withdrew from the ISS Final. The Philippines later made its best finish in the ISTAF SuperSeries so far by beating Japan in the third-place play-off.

Competitive records

ISTAF World Cup

ISTAF SuperSeries

King's Cup World Championship

Southeast Asian Games

Asian Games

Recent squad
The following players composes the Philippines national team at the 2014–15 ISTAF SuperSeries
 Jason Huerte   
 Emmanuel Escote   
 Rheyjey Ortouste   
 Arnel Isorena  
 Ronsited Gabayeron
 Carl Togonon
Source: ISTAF SuperSeries

References

External links
 ISTAF SuperSeries Profile

Sepak takraw